This article presents the discography of American pop music artist Nancy Sinatra.

Albums

Studio albums

Soundtracks

Collaborations

Compilation albums

Other appearances

Singles

Notes

References 

Discographies of American artists